GMZ may refer to:
 Gorky Motorcycle Plant, a defunct Soviet manufacturing plant
 La Gomera Airport, in the Canary Islands
 Mgbo language